Deadache is the fourth studio album by Finnish rock band Lordi, released in Finland on 29 October 2008. For the release of the album the band renewed their monster outfits. Deadache  was released during the same week in about thirty countries. The official album release party was held at the Tavastia Club in Helsinki on 31 October 2008 (Hallowe'en).

The first single from the album, "Bite It Like a Bulldog", was released on 3 September 2008. By November 2008, Deadache had sold 1,700 copies in the United States.

Recording 
Lordi started the recording of Deadache on 7 May 2008. For the album, the group had sixty demos to choose from; fourteen of them were chosen by the band and record company to be recorded. All members of the group contributed songs to the album.

The recordings were finished in June, the group then went on tour in Europe.

Press
Band members Kita and Amen said the following about the Deadache:

[Kita] "It's an old title. We had that song back in the '90s already, a song called 'Deadache', and our singer, Mr. Lordi, thought that he made that up, that whole word. Like, headache and deadache, but he heard it actually means something." [Mr. Amen] "It actually, the title, it means something. Actually we had sixty songs to choose from and we picked out fifteen songs. We didn't think any (musical) directions or anything, we just did what we have." [Kita] "Usually we don't think (laughs)" [Amen] "We do what feels good with it."

Music 
Deadache is a melodic hard rock album, but has a heavier sound and includes more horror-themes than Lordi's previous albums. The album has more keyboard parts than The Arockalypse, and the song "The Rebirth Of The Countess", composed by the keyboard player Awa, includes a spoken part in French. "Missing Miss Charlene" includes singing by a children's choir, with the outro being already recorded in 1986 by a 12-year-old Mr. Lordi and some of his friends from his hometown of Rovaniemi.

The organ in the intro and between the verses in the song "The Devil Hides Behind Her Smile" is taken from "The Phantom of the Opera".

Track listing

Bonus tracks 
There are five different versions of the album, four of which have different bonus tracks. Each version was released by a different record company, hence the differing tracks.

Personnel 
Lordi
Mr Lordi – vocals, artwork, art direction, layout
Amen – guitars
Kita – drums, backing vocals, engineering
OX – bass
Awa – keyboards

Additional musicians
Eric Schäfer – outro (13)
Pete Kangas – outro (13)
Johanna Askola-Putaansuu – noise (5)
Sandra Mittica – voice (9)
Frida – noise (3)
Shoemaker's Kids Quire – choir

Production
Tracy Lipp – recording
Jari Pailamo – engineering
Jetro Vainio – engineering
Ossi-Isso Tuomela – engineering
Jesse Vainio – mixing
Svante Forsbäck – mastering
Nino Laurenne – production
Petri Haggrén – photography

Chart

Release history

References 

2008 albums
Lordi albums
The End Records albums
GUN Records albums